Nyssicus is a genus of beetles in the family Cerambycidae, containing the following species:

 Nyssicus contaminatus Martins, 2005
 Nyssicus fernandezi Joly & Martinez, 1981
 Nyssicus mendosus Martins, 2005
 Nyssicus quadriguttatus (Swederus, 1787)
 Nyssicus rosalesi Joly & Martinez, 1981
 Nyssicus topographicus Linsley, 1935

References

Elaphidiini